In physics, the Landau pole (or the Moscow zero, or the Landau ghost) is the momentum (or energy) scale at which the coupling constant (interaction strength) of a quantum field theory becomes infinite. Such a possibility was pointed out by the physicist Lev Landau and his colleagues. The fact that couplings depend on the momentum (or length) scale is the central idea behind the renormalization group.

Landau poles appear in theories that are not asymptotically free, such as quantum electrodynamics (QED) or  theory—a scalar field with a quartic interaction—such as may describe the Higgs boson. In these theories, the renormalized coupling constant grows with energy. A Landau pole appears when the coupling becomes infinite at a finite energy scale. In a theory purporting to be complete, this could be considered a mathematical inconsistency. A possible solution is that the renormalized charge could go to zero as the cut-off is removed, meaning that the charge is completely screened by quantum fluctuations (vacuum polarization). This is a case of quantum triviality, which means that quantum corrections completely suppress the interactions in the absence of a cut-off.

Since the Landau pole is normally identified through perturbative one-loop or two-loop calculations, it is possible that the pole is merely a sign that the perturbative approximation breaks down at strong coupling. Perturbation theory may also be invalid if non-adiabatic states exist. Lattice gauge theory provides a means to address questions in quantum field theory beyond the realm of perturbation theory, and thus has been used to attempt to resolve this question.

Numerical computations performed in this framework seem to confirm Landau's conclusion that in QED the renormalized charge completely vanishes for an infinite cutoff.

Brief history

According to Landau, Abrikosov, and Khalatnikov, the relation of the observable charge  to the “bare” charge  for renormalizable field theories when  is given by

If  and  then  and the theory looks trivial.

As  grows, the bare charge  increases, to finally diverge at the renormalization point

This singularity is the Landau pole with a negative residue, .

The actual behavior of the charge  as a function of the momentum scale  is determined by the Gell-Mann–Low equation

The general behavior of  depends on the appearance of the function .

According to the classification of Bogoliubov and Shirkov, there are three qualitatively different cases:

Landau and Pomeranchuk tried to justify the possibility (c) in the case of QED and  theory. The same behavior can be obtained from the functional integrals, omitting the quadratic terms in the action. Validity of these considerations at the quantitative level is excluded by the non-quadratic form of the -function.

Nevertheless, they can be correct qualitatively. The Monte Carlo results  seems to confirm the qualitative validity of the Landau–Pomeranchuk arguments, although a different interpretation is also possible.

The case (c) in the Bogoliubov and Shirkov classification corresponds to the quantum triviality in full theory (beyond its perturbation context), as can be seen by a reductio ad absurdum. Indeed, if , the theory is internally inconsistent. It is a widespread belief  that both QED and  theory are trivial in the continuum limit.

Phenomenological aspects 
In a theory intended to represent a physical interaction where the coupling constant is known to be non-zero, Landau poles or triviality may be viewed as a sign of incompleteness in the theory. For example, QED is usually not believed to be a complete theory on its own, because it does not describe other fundamental interactions, and contains a Landau pole. Conventionally QED forms part of the more fundamental electroweak theory. The  group of electroweak theory also has a Landau pole which is usually considered to be a signal of a need for an ultimate embedding into a Grand Unified Theory. The grand unified scale would provide a natural cutoff well below the Landau scale, preventing the pole from having observable physical consequences.

The problem of the Landau pole in QED is of pure academic interest, for the following reason. ,  is played by the fine structure constant  and the Landau scale for QED is estimated as 10286 eV, which is far beyond any energy scale relevant to observable physics. For comparison, the maximum energies accessible at the Large Hadron Collider are of order 1013 eV, while the Planck scale, at which quantum gravity becomes important and the relevance of quantum field theory itself may be questioned, is 1028 eV.

The Higgs boson in the Standard Model of particle physics is described by  theory (see Quartic interaction). If the latter has a Landau pole, then this fact is used in setting a "triviality bound" on the Higgs mass. The bound depends on the scale at which new physics is assumed to enter and the maximum value of the quartic coupling permitted (its physical value is unknown). For large couplings, non-perturbative methods are required. Lattice calculations have also been useful in this context.

Connections with statistical physics 
A deeper understanding of the physical meaning and generalization of the
renormalization process leading to Landau poles comes from condensed matter physics. Leo P. Kadanoff's paper in 1966 proposed the "block-spin" renormalization group. The blocking idea is a way to define the components of the theory at large distances as aggregates of components at shorter distances. This approach was developed by Kenneth Wilson. He was awarded the Nobel prize for these decisive contributions in 1982.

Assume that we have a theory described
by a certain function  of the state variables
 and a set of coupling constants
. This function can be a partition function,
an action, or a Hamiltonian.
Consider a certain blocking transformation of the state
variables ,
the number of  must be lower than the number of
. Now let us try to rewrite the 
If this is achievable by a
certain change in the parameters, then the theory is said to be
renormalizable. The most important information in the RG flow are its fixed points. The possible macroscopic states of the system, at a large scale, are given by this set of fixed points. If these fixed points correspond to a free field theory, the theory is said to exhibit quantum triviality, and possesses a Landau pole. Numerous fixed points appear in the study of lattice Higgs theories, but it is not known whether these correspond to free field theories.

Large order perturbative calculations 
Diagrammatic calculations allow one to obtain only a few expansion coefficients , which do not allow one to investigate the  function in the whole. Progress became possible after the development of the Lipatov method for calculating large orders of perturbation theory: One may now try to interpolate the known coefficients  with their large order behavior, and to then sum the perturbation series.

The first attempts of reconstruction of the  function by this method bear on the triviality of the  theory. Application of more advanced summation methods yielded the exponent  in the asymptotic behavior , a value close to unity.

See also 
 Pole mass
 Quantum triviality

References

Quantum electrodynamics
Renormalization group